"Girls Just Want to Have Fun" is the first major single released by Cyndi Lauper.

Girls Just Want to Have Fun may also refer to:

Television
 "Girls Just Wanna Have Fun", an episode in the television series Xena: Warrior Princess
 "Girls Just Want to Have Fun", an episode from season 2 of Degrassi The Next Generation
 "Girls Just Want to Have Fun", an episode from season 2 of Married... with Children
 "Girls Just Want to Have Fun", an episode from the first season of mixed-ish

Other uses
 Girls Just Want to Have Fun (film), starring Shannen Doherty and Sarah Jessica Parker
 Girls Just Want to Have Fun (soundtrack)
 "Girls Just Wanna Have Fun" (Shaggy song), a song by reggae musician Shaggy featuring Eve
 "Girls Just Want to Have Fun", a song by Ecco2K and Bladee